John G Pritchett (born 15 February 1943) is an English amateur welterweight and professional light middle/middle/light heavyweight boxer of the 1960s and '70s, and boxing manager of the 1970s and '80s. He fought as Johnny Pritchett.

Boxing career
As an amateur won the Amateur Boxing Association of England (ABAE) 1959 Junior Class-A title against B. Ford (St Peters ABC), boxing out of Bingham & District ABC, won the 1962 Amateur Boxing Association of England welterweight title, against Harry Dean (Oxford YMCA), boxing out of Bingham & District ABC and won the 1963 Amateur Boxing Association of England welterweight title, against Ralph Charles (West Ham ABC), boxing out of Bingham & District ABC.

He represented England and won the silver medal at welterweight in the Boxing at the 1962 British Empire and Commonwealth Games in Perth, Western Australia, losing to Wallace Coe of New Zealand.

Boxing manager
Pritchett managed; Dave Needham, Howard Hayes, Johnny Cheshire, and Dave Symonds.

References

External links

Image - Johnny Pritchett

1945 births
Living people
Boxers at the 1962 British Empire and Commonwealth Games
Boxers from Nottingham
Boxing managers
Commonwealth Games medallists in boxing
Commonwealth Games silver medallists for England
English male boxers
Light-heavyweight boxers
Light-middleweight boxers
Middleweight boxers
People from Bingham, Nottinghamshire
Sportspeople from Nottinghamshire
Medallists at the 1962 British Empire and Commonwealth Games